Abū'l-Qasim ʿAbd Allāh ibn Muhammad ibn al-Qa'im (Arabic: أبو القاسم عبد الله بن محمد بن القائم) better known by his regnal name Al-Muqtadi (Arabic: المقتدي 'the follower'; 1056 – February 1094) was the Abbasid caliph in Baghdad from 1075 to 1094. He succeeded his grandfather caliph al-Qa'im in 1075 as the twenty-seventh Abbasid caliph.

Biography 
He was born to Muhammad Dhakirat, the son of caliph Al-Qa'im, and an Armenian slave girl. His full name was ʿAbd Allāh ibn Muhammad ibn al-Qa'im and his Kunya was Abū'l-Qasim. He was born in 1056 CE 447–448 AH.

When al-Qa'im was on his deathbed in 1075, Fakhr ad-Dawla took charge of his personal care - al-Qa'im did not want bloodletting but Fakhr ad-Dawla had it done anyway. Before he died, al-Qa'im advised his grandson and successor al-Muqtadi to keep the Banu Jahir in their position: "I have not seen better persons for the dawla than Ibn Jahir and his son; do not turn away from them." Al-Muqtadi ascended to the throne on 2 April 1075.

In 1077, deadly riots broke out in Baghdad between the city's Hanbali and Ash'ari factions when Abu Nasr ibn al-Ustadh Abi al-Qasim al-Qushayri arrived in town to become lecturer at the city's nizamiyya. During the riots, Nizam al-Mulk's son Mu'ayyad al-Mulk's life was endangered. Nizam al-Mulk blamed Fakhr ad-Dawla for the whole affair and in 1078 sent his representative Gohar-A'in to the caliph to demand Fakhr ad-Dawla's removal and to have the Banu Jahir's followers arrested. Gohar-A'in arrived on 23 July and was granted an audience on Tuesday, 14 August, during which he handed over a letter requesting Fakhr ad-Dawla's removal. Al-Muqtadi initially balked at the demand, but by 27 August Gohar-A'in was threatening to attack the palace unless he complied. At that point, al-Muqtadi had no choice – the Abbasids lacked a military of their own and were powerless to resist Seljuk interference. Fakhr ad-Dawla apparently resigned (instead of being fired) and al-Muqtadi had him placed under house arrest.

Meanwhile, Amid ad-Dawla had left for Isfahan once he heard of Nizam al-Mulk's plans. He took a circuitous route through the mountains to avoid running into Gohar-A'in on the way, and he reached Isfahan on 23 July – the same day that Gohar A'in reached Baghdad. Amid ad-Dawla met with Nizam al-Mulk and the two parties eventually reconciled, which they sealed with a marriage contract between Nizam al-Mulk's granddaughter and Amid ad-Dawla. Al-Muqtadi did not initially rehire the Banu Jahir and instead kept them under house arrest, but Nizam al-Mulk later intervened and got them rehired.

Also during Ramadan of 1078 (March-April), Fakhr ad-Dawla had had a minbar (pulpit) made at his expense and bearing the titles of al-Muqtadi. It later ended up broken up and burned down. 

In 1081, the caliph sent Fakhr ad-Dawla to Isfahan, laden with gifts and over 20,000 dinars, to negotiate marriage with Malik-Shah's daughter. Malik-Shah was grieving the death of his son Da'ud and did not take part i; the negotiations; rather, Fakhr ad-Dawla went to Nizam al-Mulk. The two worked together this time; they went to the princess's foster mother, Turkan Khatun, to make their request. She was disinterested at first because the Ghaznavid ruler had made a better offer: 100,000 dinars. Khadija Arslan Khatun, who had been married to al-Qa'im, told her that a marriage with the caliph would be more prestigious, and that she should not be asking the caliph for more money. 

Eventually, Turkan Khatun agreed to the marriage, but with heavy conditions imposed on al-Muqtadi: in return for marrying the Seljuk princess, al-Muqtadi would pay 50,000 dinars plus an additional 100,000 dinars as mahr (bridal gift), give up his current wives and concubines, and agree to not have sexual relations with any other woman. This was an especially heavy significant burden on the Abbasid caliph, since the Abbasids had been tightly controlling their "reproductive politics", with all their heirs being born to umm walads and therefore unrelated to any rival dynasties. By agreeing to Turkan Khatun's terms, Fakhr ad-Dawla was putting al-Muqtadi at a severe disadvantage while also benefitting the Seljuks considerably.

In 1083, al-Muqtadi removed the Banu Jahir from office by decree. The circumstances of their removal from office are somewhat unclear - historians gave varying accounts. In Sibt ibn al-Jawzi's version, al-Muqtadi had become suspicious of the Banu Jahir, prompting them to leave for Khorasan without requesting official permission; this further aroused al-Muqtadi's suspicions and he retroactively fired them after they had left. He then wrote to the Seljuks, telling them not to employ the Banu Jahir in their administration. In Ibn al-Athir's version, the Seljuks at some point approached al-Muqtadi and asked to employ the Banu Jahir themselves, and al-Muqtadi agreed. Al-Bundari offers no details about the firing itself but wrote instead that the Seljuks sent representatives to meet the Banu Jahir in Baghdad (rather than in Khorasan).

According to Ibn al-Athir's account, the Banu Jahir left Baghdad on Saturday, 22 July 1083. They were succeeded as viziers by Abu'l-Fath al-Muzaffar, son of the ra'is al-ru'asa''', who had previously been "in charge of the palace buildings".

Al-Muqtadi was honored by the Seljuk sultan Malik-Shah I, during whose reign the Caliphate was recognized throughout the extending range of Seljuk conquest. Arabia, with the Holy Cities, now recovered from the Fatimids, acknowledged again the spiritual jurisdiction of the Abbasids. 

Malik-Shah I arranged a marriage between his daughter and al-Muqtadi, possibly planning on the birth of a son who could serve as both caliph and sultan. Though the couple had a son, the mother left with her infant to the court of Isfahan.
Following the failure of the marriage, the Sultan grew critical of the Caliph's interference in affairs of state, and sent an order for him to retire to Basra. The death of Malik-Shah I shortly after, however, made the command inoperative.

In 1092, when Malik Shah I was assassinated shortly after Nizam al-Mulk, Taj al-Mulk nominated Mahmud as Sultan and set out for Isfahan. Mahmud was a child, and his mother Terken Khatun wished to seize power in his stead. To accomplish this, she entered negotiations with the Caliph al-Muqtadi to secure her rule. The Caliph opposed both a child and a woman as ruler, and could not be persuaded to allow the khutba, the sign of the sovereign, to be proclaimed in the name of a woman. Eventually, however, the Caliph agreed to let her govern if the khutba was said in the name of her son, and if she did so assisted by a vizier he appointed for her, a condition she saw herself forced to accept.

Family
Al-Muqtadi's first wife was Sifri Khatun. She was the daughter of Sultan Alp Arslan. In 1071–72, his father Al-Qa'im sent his wazir Ibn Al-Jahir to ask her hand in marriage, to which demand the Sultan agreed. His second wife was Mah-i Mulk Khatun, daughter of Sultan Malik-Shah I. In March 1082, Al-Muqtadi sent Abu Nasr ibn Jahir to Malik Shah in Isfahan to ask for her hand in marriage. Her father gave his consent and the marriage contract was concluded. She arrived Baghdad in March 1087. The marriage was consummated in May, 1087. She gave birth to Prince Ja'far on 31 January 1088. But then Al-Muqtadi began to avoid her and she asked permission to return home. She left Baghdad for Khurasan on 29 May 1089, accompanied by her son. Subsequently, news of her death reached Baghdad. Her ailing father, brought her son back to Baghdad in October 1092. Prince Ja'far was taken back to the Caliphal Palace, where he remained until his death on 21 June 1093. He was buried near the caliphal tombs in the Rusafah Cemetery. Al-Muqtadi had one concubine, Taif Al-Afwah. She was an Egyptian, and was the mother of his son, the future Caliph Al-Mustazhir.

 Succession 
Al-Muqtadi died in 1094 at the age of 37–38. He was succeeded by his 16-year-old son Ahmad al-Mustazhir as Caliph.

 See also 
Banu Jahir: family of viziers that were prominent under al-Muqtadi's reign

 References This text is adapted from William Muir's public domain, The Caliphate: Its Rise, Decline, and Fall.''

1056 births
1094 deaths
11th-century Abbasid caliphs
11th century in Iraq
Arab people of Armenian descent
11th-century Arabs